Union University is a higher education institution with headquarters in Belgrade, Serbia. Founded on 21 June 2005, it has 3,114 enrolled students as of 2018–2019 school year, which makes it the fifth largest private university in Serbia.

Faculties
Union University consists of four faculties (number of enrolled students as of 2020–21 academic year):

See also
 Education in Serbia
 List of universities in Serbia

References

External links
 

Universities and colleges in Serbia
Universities in Belgrade
Educational institutions established in 2005
2005 establishments in Serbia and Montenegro